The 2019–20 Pepperdine Waves men's basketball team represented Pepperdine University during the 2019–20 NCAA Division I men's basketball season. The Waves were led by head coach Lorenzo Romar, in the second season of his second stint after coaching the Waves from 1996 to 1999. They played their home games at the Firestone Fieldhouse in Malibu, California as members of the West Coast Conference. They finished the season 16–16, 8–8 in WCC play to finish in sixth place. They defeated Santa Clara in the second round of the WCC tournament before losing in the third round to Saint Mary's.

Previous season
The Waves finished the 2018–19 season 16–18, 8–10 in WCC play to finish in eighth place. They defeated Pacific, Loyola Marymount, and San Francisco to advance to the semifinals of the WCC tournament were they were defeated by Gonzaga.

Offseason

Departures

Incoming transfers

Recruiting class of 2019

Recruiting class of 2020

Roster

Schedule and results

|-
!colspan=9 style=| Non conference regular season

|-
!colspan=9 style=| WCC regular season

|-
!colspan=9 style=| WCC tournament

Source:

References

Pepperdine Waves men's basketball seasons
Pepperdine
Pepperdine
Pepperdine